Death Threat is a 2009 studio album by industrial disco band My Life with the Thrill Kill Kult.

Release
Death Threat was released by the band's own SleazeBox Records label. In Italy, the album was released in digipack format by Rustblade.

Touring
The band toured the U.S. in support of the album during May 2009. The live lineup of the Death Threat Tour included Groovie Mann, Buzz McCoy, Justin Thyme, Pepper Somerset, Stella Suicide, and Brett Piranha.

Track listing

Credits
 Artwork – Buzz McCoy, Groovie Mann
 Directed By – Groovie Mann
 Drums – Adam Aaronson, Justin Bennett
 Producer – Buzz McCoy
 Sampler – Bill Van Ryn, Curse Mackey
 Vocals – Pepper Somerset, Rayzor, Wickedboy X
 Written-By – Buzz McCoy, Groovie Mann

References

External links

2009 albums
My Life with the Thrill Kill Kult albums